Temple B'nai Sholom is a historic synagogue in Huntsville, Alabama.  The Reform congregation was founded in 1876, with the current building dedicated November 26, 1899. It is the oldest synagogue building in continuous use in the state.   It was listed on the Alabama Register of Landmarks and Heritage on July 29, 1977.

References

External links
 Official website

Buildings and structures in Huntsville, Alabama
Jews and Judaism in Appalachia
Reform synagogues in Alabama
Properties on the Alabama Register of Landmarks and Heritage
Historic district contributing properties in Alabama
National Register of Historic Places in Huntsville, Alabama
Properties of religious function on the National Register of Historic Places in Alabama
Synagogues on the National Register of Historic Places
Synagogues completed in 1899